Rosa Porten (18 February 1884 – 7 May 1972) was a prolific German screenwriter, actress, and director during the silent film era.

Early life 
Porten was born in Düsseldorf, Germany, the daughter of Franz Porten and Wincenzia Porten (née Wybiral). She had a younger sister, Henny Porten, and a younger brother, Fritz Porten. Her father was an opera singer and her sister was a popular film star in Germany.

Career 
As a child, Porten and her sister would often appear in school plays and moving picture image collections featuring opera and arias that their father shot.

As a director, Porten's films were notable for featuring storylines centered on women.

Personal life 
Porten was married to director Franz Eckstein. She died in 1972 in Munich, Germany.

Filmography 
The following is a selected list of works by Porten. Film archivists suspect that Porten worked on over 50 films, but most have not survived due to the flammable nature of the films of that period. Her films have been featured in film festivals like The Fifth International Women and the Silent Screen Conference, Stockholm University, Sweden in June 2008, Il Cinema Ritrovato and UNESCO’s World Day for Audiovisual Heritage in 2010 and 2014.

Screenwriter 
 1928: Die Heiratsfalle - writer, director
 1927: The Girl from Abroad - writer
 1927: Fahrendes Volk (documentary short) - writer
 1925: Hedda Gabler  (screenplay) - writer
 1924: Die Schmetterlingsschlacht - writer
 1922: Your Bad Reputation - writer, actor
 1921: Your Brother's Wife - writer
 1921: Die Hexe - writer
 1921: Die Rächer - writer
 1921: Lotte Lore - writer
 1921: Was tat ich dir? - writer
 1921: You Are the Life  - writer
 1921: Durch Liebe erlöst - writer
 1921: Opfer der Liebe - writer
 1920: Badebubi - writer
 1920: Das Drama von Glossow - writer
 1920: Auri Sacra Fames, 2. Teil - Das Testament eines Exzentrischen - writer, actor
 1920: Auri Sacra Fames, 1. Teil - An der Liebe Narrenseil - writer, actor
 1920: Themis - writer, actor
 1919: Die da sterben, wenn sie lieben - writer
 1918: Die Augen der Schwester - writer, actor
 1918: Ihr Junge - writer, actor
 1918: Film Kathi - writer, director, actor
 1918: Der Trompeter von Säckingen - writer
 1917: Die nicht lieben dürfen... - writer, director, actor
 1917: Ihr laßt den Armen schuldig werden - writer, actor 
 1917: The Coquette - writer, director, actor
 1917: The Newest Star of Variety - writer, director, actor
 1917: Gräfin Maruschka - writer, director, actor
 1916: Die Wäscher-Resl - writer, director, actor
 1916: Das große Schweigen - writer
 1915: Abgründe - writer
 1911: Das Liebesglück der Blinden = The Happy Love of a Blind Girl (short) - writer

Actor 
 1921: Die Rächer - actor
 1910: Das Geheimnis der Toten (short) - actor
 1910: Wem gehört das Kind? = Who owns the child? (short) - actor
 In 2014, Fondazione Cineteca di Bologna restored this nitrate film that was in the holdings of the Deutsche Kinemathek
 1909: Der Brief an den lieben Gott (short) - actor
 1909: Die kleine Baroness (short) - actor
 1909: Othello (short) - actor, as Emilia
 1908: Funiculi Funicula (short) - actor 
 1906: Apachentanz (short) - actor 
 1906: Meißner Porzellan (short) - actor, as Dame

Director 
As a director, Porten often co-directed with her husband, Franz Eckstein; in these instances she used the pseudonym, Dr. R. Portegg.
 1920: Die List Einer Zigarettenmacherin = Wanda's Trick - director (as R. Portegg)
 1918: Not of the Woman Born - director
 1918: Der Dieb - director (as R. Portegg)
 1917: Das Opfer der Yella Rogesius = The Victim of the Yella Rogesius - director (as R. Portegg)
 1917: Das Teufelchen = The Devil - director (as Dr. R. Portegg)
 In 2013, Österreichisches Filmmuseum = Austrian Film Museum restored this nitrate film, with the photochemical preservation process completed by Svenska Filminstitutet. Original had special tinting which was recreated via the Desmet method
 1917: Die Landpomeranze = The Unwieldy Country Woman - director (as Dr. R. Portegg)

Works and publications 
 Porten, Rosa. Die Filmprinzeß: Roman aus der Kino-Welt. = The Film Princess. Berlin: Eysler, 1919.

References

External links 
 
Rosa Porten on the Women Film Pioneers Project 

Actors from Düsseldorf
German women film directors
Film people from Düsseldorf
German film actresses
German silent film actresses
20th-century German actresses
1884 births
1972 deaths
Women film pioneers